On June 17, 1946, the most powerful tornado to strike Windsor, Ontario, moved through the town at F4 intensity. The tornado touched down near River Rouge, Michigan, then crossed the Detroit River and made landfall in the Brighton Beach neighbourhood of Windsor. It then cut across southern Windsor and northern Sandwich West Township, Ontario (now the Municipality of LaSalle, Ontario), along a path  in length. It also cut across Highway 3 before weakening somewhat. The storm then touched down as an F4 again at the modern-day intersection of Walker Road and Grand Marais Road, near the center of the city.

Path of destruction 

The tornado took a northeastward path, cutting through farmland and forest, an area with few housing subdivisions (at the time, but still many homes), and narrowly missing Windsor Airport (which was located just south of the tornado), before tearing through the northwest part of the Town of Tecumseh, Ontario and dissipating over Lake St. Clair.

The storm's damage ranged from F3–F4, to some “marginal” F5 damage from completely destroyed houses that were lifted off their foundations.

Since the tornado had cut power to The Windsor Star's main printing offices downtown the Detroit News offered to help them print their newspapers at their printing facilities until the Star'''s were repaired, and even gave the Star'' priority so they could report the news of the tornado to the cities of Windsor, Detroit, and the rest of Ontario.

The tornado knocked out power to most of the city for about a day, and damaged or destroyed roughly 400 homes in Windsor.

Radio reports 
Although a Windsor-based radio station broadcast to the areas affected by the tornado, there are no recordings in the archives regarding this tornado.  CBC Toronto is the only radio station that has kept its archives for the reports on this event. CBC Archives helps to explain what happened in Windsor on the day it was struck by the tornado as well as the day after. The report explains what happened, how many were killed, how citizens felt, and even what was stolen and who came out to help. Additionally, many reports were made to explain how the tornado was formed. The reports also contain interviews of people who viewed the tornado firsthand.

Aftermath 
After the tornado, civility and order were quickly restored by the police. Many accounts of the tornado were told over the radio (notably, CKLW, which was Windsor's CBC radio affiliate at the time), and the Ontario Provincial Government even explained the conditions that are favourable for tornado development, to alleviate the public's fears of an "epidemic of tornadoes", especially since one week later, a tornado struck the towns of Fort Frances and International Falls.

It was also just half a mile from the same spot the Windsor Tornado of 1974 touched down.

17 people passed away as a result of the tornado, including Waldo Beaman, his brother Milo Beaman, Waldo's new bride Sylvia Hillier-Beaman and their unborn child Oakley Beaman who doctors tried but failed to save.

See also
 Tornadoes of 1946
 List of tornadoes and tornado outbreaks
 List of North American tornadoes and tornado outbreaks
 List of Canadian tornadoes
 List of tornadoes striking downtown areas

References

External links
 Environment Canada account of the tornado with additional clips from The Windsor Star
 The Windsor – Tecumseh, Ontario Tornado on the CBC Archives
 The Windsor Tornado – CBC Archives
 
 
 Yahoo! - Canada's third deadliest tornado hit Windsor, Ontario in 1946

F4 tornadoes by date
Windsor-Tecumseh, Ontario,1946-06-17
1946 in Canada
Tornadoes of 1946
History of Windsor, Ontario
1946-06-17,River Rouge
Tornadoes in Canada by date
Windsor-Tecumseh, Ontario,1946-06-17
1946 in Ontario
Windsor-Tecumseh, Ontario Tornado
Windsor-Tecumseh, Ontario Tornado